Professional Scouters are paid, employees and staff of national and local Scouting organizations. The term may refer to:

 Chief Scout Executive
 Professional Scouter (Boy Scouts of America)
 Scout Commissioner